Gondeh Jin or Gandehjin, also rendered as Ganeh Jin, may refer to:
 Gondeh Jin, Bahar
 Gondeh Jin, Kabudarahang